Şahane (Great) is the eighth studio album of Ebru Gündeş, the Turkish pop-folk, actress, and television personality. On her album there are of 15 songs. The album was published by Erol Köse Production in 2003. The single from the album are '"Ceza mı?" and "Alev Alev".

Track listing

References 

2003 albums
Ebru Gündeş albums